Tour Paradis (Paradise Tower), also commonly named Tour des Finances de Liège (Financial Tower of Liège), is a 136-metre office skyscraper located in the Guillemins area of Liège, Belgium. Constructed from 2012 to 2014, it is the tallest skyscraper in Wallonia.

The façade is made of Photovoltaic Glazings manufactured by ISSOL, a Belgian company specialized in Building Integrated Photovoltaics.

The building was inaugurated in 2015 and became the workplace of more than 1000 employees from SPF Finances.

In 2022, it was announced in the media that the tower was underoccupied due to the generalization of homeworking that started during the Covid-19 crisis.

Buildings and structures in Liège
Skyscraper office buildings in Belgium
Office buildings completed in 2014
2014 establishments in Belgium